Shattered Lives is a 1925 American silent drama film directed by Henry McCarty and starring Edith Roberts, Robert Gordon, and Ethel Wales.

Plot
As described in a film magazine review, Mumsie is living on a farm with Donald, not knowing that he is her real son, having adopted him following a train wreck several years before. Her real son had been taken away by her husband when the boy was an infant. Red Myers is put in her home, posing as her son, by a shyster lawyer. The father, who has made a fortune in Alaska, is returning home to Mumsie when the plotters attempt to waylay him. Donald assists in the rescue of his father and it becomes evident that he is the rightful heir, while Red is apprehended. Donald marries Sally.

Cast

References

Bibliography
 Connelly, Robert B. The Silents: Silent Feature Films, 1910-36, Volume 40, Issue 2. December Press, 1998.
 Munden, Kenneth White. The American Film Institute Catalog of Motion Pictures Produced in the United States, Part 1. University of California Press, 1997.

External links
 

1925 films
1925 drama films
1920s English-language films
American silent feature films
Silent American drama films
Films directed by Henry McCarty
American black-and-white films
Gotham Pictures films
1920s American films
English-language drama films